Series 33 of University Challenge began on 15 September 2003, with the final on 12 April 2004.

Results
 Winning teams are highlighted in bold.
 Teams with green scores (winners) returned in the next round, while those with red scores (losers) were eliminated.
 Teams with orange scores have lost, but survived as the first round losers with the highest losing scores.
 A score in italics indicates a match decided on a tie-breaker question.

First round

Highest Scoring Losers Playoffs

Second round

Quarter-finals

Semi-finals

Final

 The trophy and title were awarded to the Magdalen team comprising Dave Cox, Matt Holdcroft, Freya McClements, and Josh Spero.
 The trophy was presented by Bill Bryson.

References

External links
 University Challenge Homepage
 Blanchflower Results Table

2003
2003 British television seasons
2004 British television seasons